The Coral Triangle Initiative on Coral Reefs, Fisheries, and Food Security (CTI-CFF), also shortly known as the Coral Triangle Initiative (CTI), is a multilateral partnership of six countries (Indonesia, Malaysia, Philippines, Papua New Guinea, Solomon Islands, Timor-Leste) working together to sustain marine and coastal resources by addressing crucial issues such as food security, climate change, and marine biodiversity.

Background 
The "Coral Triangle" (CT) region is located along the equator at the confluence of the Western Pacific and Indian Oceans. Using coral and reef fish diversity as the two major criteria, the boundaries of this region are defined by scientists as covering all or part of the exclusive economic zones of six countries: Indonesia, Malaysia, Papua New Guinea, Philippines, Solomon Islands and Timor-Leste (the ‘CT6’).

Covering 1.62% of the planet's oceanic area, there is broad scientific consensus that the CT represents the global epicentre of marine life abundance and diversity—with 76% of all known coral species, 37% of all known coral reef fish species, 53% of the world's coral reefs, the largest extent of mangrove forests in the world, and spawning and juvenile growth areas for the world's largest tuna fishery. It also a spawning and nursery ground for six species of threatened marine turtles, endangered fish and cetaceans such as tuna and blue whales.

Moreover, the biogeographical conditions within the CT may also enable the region to maintain its high productivity in the face of future impacts of climate change, making it potentially the world's most important "refuge" for marine life. The natural productivity of the Coral Triangle region not only makes it unique for its wildlife and marine and coastal ecosystems, but also for the benefits derived for local communities and governments. These unparalleled marine and coastal living resources provide significant benefits to the approximately 363 million people who reside in the Coral Triangle, as well as billions more outside the region. As a source of food, income and protection from severe weather events, the ongoing health of these ecosystems is critical.

These marine and coastal resources are under significant and increasing threat. The Coral Triangle sits at a crossroads of rapidly expanding populations, economic growth, and international trade. Fish and other marine resources are a principal source of income, food, livelihoods, and export revenues in all of the CT countries. Tuna, live reef fish, and shrimp, for example, feed a fast-growing demand in Japan, the US, Europe, China, and elsewhere.

These and other factors are generating increased pressures on marine and coastal resources, including: over-fishing, unsustainable fishing practices, land-based sources of marine pollution, coastal habitat conversion, and climate change. The current status of marine and coastal resources across the region, along with future projections, is of great concern.

Establishment 
Viewing it necessary to safeguard the region's marine and coastal resources, Indonesian President Yudhoyono convinced other leaders in the region to launch the Coral Triangle Initiative on Coral Reefs, Fisheries and Food Security (CTI-CFF) in 2009. The CTI-CFF is a multilateral partnership between the governments of Indonesia, Malaysia, Papua New Guinea, Philippines, Solomon Islands and Timor-Leste (the ‘CT6’).

At the Leader's Summit in 2009, these governments agreed to adopt a 10-year CTI-CFF Regional Plan of Action (CTI RPOA) to safeguard the region's marine and coastal biological resources. Through the CTI-CFF, the Coral Triangle countries have agreed to support people-centered biodiversity conservation, sustainable development, poverty reduction and equitable benefit sharing. The CTI-CFF seeks to address both poverty reduction through economic development, food security, sustainable livelihoods for coastal communities and biodiversity conservation through the protection of species, habitats and ecosystems.

5 Goals of Regional Plan of Action 

 Priority seascapes designated and effectively managed
 Ecosystem Approach to Management of Fisheries (EAFM) and other marine resources fully applied
 Marine Protected Areas (MPAs) established and effectively managed
 Climate change adaptation measures achieved
 Threatened species status improving

Regional Secretariat 
The Coral Triangle Initiative on Coral Reefs, Fisheries and Food Security (CTI-CFF) Regional Secretariat was created during the First CTI-CFF Senior Officials  Meeting in Bali in December 2007.

It is mandated to promote regional cooperation, sharing of lessons, as well as facilitate learning across the six Coral Triangle countries - Indonesia, Malaysia, Papua New Guinea, Philippines, Solomon Islands and Timor-Leste. The Regional Secretariat also coordinate and monitors the progress in achieving the CTI-CFF Regional Plan of Action goals. Its main activities cover the following areas: organizational development, outreach and communication, regional coordination and mechanisms, technical and thematic working groups, development of key regional reports, and capacity development. It also serves as the main liaison and for all CTI-CFF official functions such as the bi-annual CTI-CFF Senior Officials Meetings and the annual CTI-CFF Ministerial Meetings.  It is based at CTI-CFF Regional Secretariat Headquarter in Manado, North Sulawesi, Indonesia.

Geographic scope for implementation of the Plan of Action

The CTI-CFF Plan of Action may be implemented within waters under national jurisdiction of each of the Coral Triangle governments, in accordance with their rights and obligations pursuant to international laws and the prevailing laws, rules and regulations of each country. The scope of application of the CTI is without prejudice to the sovereign rights of the parties over marine resources within national jurisdiction, or the position of the parties on delimitation of maritime boundaries between States with opposite or adjacent coasts. The geographic scope of implementation of the CTI is not intended in any way to redraw the scientific boundaries of the Coral Triangle, which would continue to be defined by coral and coral reef fish diversity.

See also 
 Coral Triangle Day
 Coral Triangle

References 

International organizations based in Asia
Environment of the Philippines
Environment of Indonesia
Environment of Malaysia
Environment of the Solomon Islands
Environment of East Timor
Environment of Papua New Guinea